Calheta de São Miguel is a city in the northern part of the island of Santiago, Cape Verde. In 2010 its population was 3,175. It is the seat of São Miguel municipality.
Calheta de São Miguel forms an urban agglomeration with the adjacent settlements Veneza and Ponta Verde, total population 5,615 (2010).

Population

References

São Miguel, Cape Verde
Cities in Cape Verde
Geography of Santiago, Cape Verde
Municipal seats in Cape Verde
Populated coastal places in Cape Verde